Proposition 54 is a California ballot proposition that passed on the November 8, 2016 ballot. It requires the recording and posting of videos of public meetings of the State Legislature. The measure requires the recordings to be posted on the internet within 24 hours of a meeting, available online for at least 72 hours before a bill can be passed, and downloadable for at least 20 years. The measure also allows members of the public to record meetings.

Arguments for the measure stated that it would increase transparency in the Legislature and provide time for bills to be reviewed by the public before going to vote. Arguments against the measure stated that it would slow down the legislative process, and give lobbying efforts time to campaign after a bill has already been completed.

Proposition 54 was approved by voters.

References

External links 
 Yes on Proposition 54
 No on Proposition 54

2016 California ballot propositions
California State Legislature